Trams in Szeged are an important part of the public transport network serving Szeged, Hungary. 

The system is operated by Szegedi Közlekedési Társaság (SZKT) with MÁV-START Zrt. operating services in addition to the SZKT. Szeged's tram system is run on a  track and is powered by 600 V electfication system.

Network evolution 
During its history the network has had these lines:

 Line 1 (Szeged pályaudvar – Szeged Plaza) 1884 –
 Line 2 (Szeged pályaudvar – Európa liget) 2012 –
 Line 3 (Tarján – Vadaspark) 1908 –
 Line 3F (Tarján – Fonógyári út)
 Line 4 (Tarján – Kecskés) 1908 –

Abolished lines:
 Line 2 (Anna-kút – Somogyi telep) 1927 – 1977
 Line 5 (Széchenyi tér – Újszeged pu. (gyermekkórház) 1948 – 1969
 Line 6 (Marx tér – Átrakó pu.) 1950 – 1966
 Line 7 (Rókusi kórház / Somogyi utca – Kiskundorozsma) 1950 – 1977

Planned line:

 Tram-train line to Hódmezővásárhely - under construction as of 2019, planned opening date: September 2021

Current routes

Fleet

Current fleet 
 9 PESA Swing 120Nb, 2011-
 18 ČKD Tatra KT4D, 2005-
 13 ČKD Tatra T6A2, 1997-
 4 ČKD SZKT B6A2D-M, 1997-

Heritage fleet 
 1 FVV1100-type vintage tram No. 609, ex-Budapest 1124, built in 1962; not in regular service.
 1 MVG vintage tram No. 12, not in regular service.
 2  vintage tram No. 313-314, not in regular service.

Past fleet 
 14 FVV CSM–2 / FVV HCS-3a uni-directional tram, with 3 doors, 1962-2003
 11 FVV CSM–3 / FVV HCS-5a bi-directional tram, with 5 doors, 1967-2000
 21 FVV CSM–4 / FVV HCS-10a bi-directional tram, with 10 doors, 1973-2011

See also

List of town tramway systems in Hungary
List of town tramway systems in Europe

References

External links

 Szegedi Közlekedési Társaság (SZKT) - official site
 Trams in Szeged 
 Villamosok.hu 
 Trams of Hungary

Szeged
Szeged
Szeged
600 V DC railway electrification